The 2019 Atlanta Braves season was the Braves' 54th season in Atlanta, 149th overall, and third season at SunTrust Park. The Braves clinched a playoff spot for the second consecutive year on September 14. They clinched their second consecutive National League East championship on September 20 but lost to the St. Louis Cardinals in the Division Series. On October 9, they became the first team to allow 10 runs in the first inning of an MLB playoff game, essentially clinching their tenth straight postseason series loss.

Offseason

October 2018 
On October 29, Ryan Flaherty, Brad Brach, Rene Rivera, Kurt Suzuki, Brandon McCarthy, Aníbal Sánchez, Peter Moylan, Nick Markakis, and Lucas Duda elected free agency.

November 2018 
On November 1, the Braves acquired Raffy Lopez for cash considerations.
On November 20, the Braves selected the contracts of Alex Jackson, Jacob Webb, Patrick Weigel, and Huascar Ynoa.
On November 26, the Braves signed Brian McCann to a 1-year, $2 million contract. 
On November 26, the Braves signed Josh Donaldson to a 1-year, $23 million contract.

January 2019 
On January 22, the Braves re-signed Nick Markakis to a 1-year $6 million contract.

March 2019 
On March 23, the Braves acquired Matt Joyce from the San Francisco Giants for cash considerations.

Regular season

April 2019 
 On April 2, 2019, Ronald Acuña Jr and the Braves agreed to an eight-year contract worth $100 million. The extension included team options for the 2027 and 2028 seasons. Aged 21, Acuña became the youngest player in baseball history to sign a contract worth at least $100 million. Acuña's deal was the largest for any player with less than one year of major league service. By June 2019, Acuña had drawn attention for his power production.
 On April 11, 2019, Ozzie Albies signed a seven-year, $35 million extension to remain with the Braves. The deal includes options for the 2026 and 2027 seasons. Both years are worth $7 million with a $4 million buyout.
 On April 28, the Braves acquired Jerry Blevins from the Oakland Athletics for cash considerations.

May 2019 
 On May 20, the Braves acquired Anthony Swarzak and cash considerations from the Seattle Mariners in exchange for Arodys Vizcaíno and Jesse Biddle.

June 2019 
 On June 7, the Braves signed free agent Dallas Keuchel to a one-year deal worth $13 million.

July 2019 
 On July 24, Shane Carle was designated for assignment and in a subsequent move the Braves added Jeremy Walker to the roster. The next day Carle was traded to the Texas Rangers for cash consideration.
 On July 30, the Braves traded minor league pitcher Kolby Allard to the Texas Rangers in exchange for Chris Martin.
 On July 31, the Braves traded Dan Winkler and Tristan Beck to the San Francisco Giants in exchange for Mark Melancon.
 On July 31, the Braves traded Joey Wentz and Travis Demeritte to the Detroit Tigers in exchange for Shane Greene.

August 2019 
 On August 5, the Cincinnati Reds claimed pitcher Kevin Gausman off waivers.
 On August 15, the Braves added Adeiny Hechavarria due to an injury to starting shortstop Dansby Swanson and ineffectiveness from his replacements.
 On August 19, the Braves claimed outfielder Billy Hamilton off of waivers from the Kansas City Royals.
On August 24, the Braves signed catcher Francisco Cervelli to add catching depth while Brian McCann is injured.
On August 24, Ronald Acuna Jr. joined the 30/30 club (36 home runs and 30 stolen bases). Acuna was the first Brave to accomplish this feat since 1991. Acuna joins Hank Aaron (1963), Dale Murphy (1983) and Ron Gant (1990 and ’91) as the only Braves players to produce a 30-30 season. Acuna accomplished this feat through 130 team games, making him the fastest in franchise history to do so.

September 2019 

 On September 5, the Braves activated relief pitcher Darren O'Day from the 60-day injured list and added him to the active roster along with Adam Duvall. O'Day was acquired from the Baltimore Orioles at the 2018 trade deadline but did not pitch for the Braves during the 2018 season due to a hamstring injury. O'Day had been sidelined for most of the 2019 season after experiencing right forearm discomfort during a spring training outing. To make room on the roster Alex Jackson was recalled from Gwinnett and placed on the 60-day injured list.
 On September 14, the Braves beat the Washington Nationals 10-1 clinching a playoff berth and decreasing their magic number to four. In a scary moment during the game Charlie Culberson had squared around to bunt when a pitch from Fernando Rodney struck him in the face. Culberson was unable to continue in the game and had to be taken to the hospital. He would not return for the remainder of the season.
On September 19, Ronald Acuna hit his 40th home run against Aaron Nola and the Philadelphia Phillies. At 21 years-old Acuna is the youngest person ever to hit 40 home runs and steal 30 bases. Acuna has 37 stolen bases on the year needing only three more to reach the 40/40 club. The Braves went on to win the game and decrease their magic number to win the National League East to one game.
On September 20, the Atlanta Braves clinched their 20th divisional title, capturing the NL East, and tying the MLB record for most divisional titles in the league, tied with the Yankees. The Yankees clinched their 20th divisional title on September 19, 2019.  In capturing the division, Mike Foltynewicz pitched eight shutout innings in a 6-0 triumph over the San Francisco Giants, which eliminated them from the postseason.

Regular season

Game log

Source:

|-style="background:#fbb;"
| 1
| March 28
| @ Phillies
| 4–10
| Nola (1–0)
| Teherán (0–1)
| —
| 
| 44,469
| 0–1
| L1
|-style="background:#fbb;"
| 2
| March 30
| @ Phillies
| 6–8
| Morgan (1–0)
| Parsons (0–1)
| —
| Citizens Bank Park
| 44,597
| 0–2
| L2
|-style="background:#fbb;"
| 3
| March 31
| @ Phillies
| 1–5
| Arrieta (1–0)
| Wright (0–1)
| —
| Citizens Bank Park
| 41,410
| 0–3
| L3
|-style="background:#bfb;"
| 4
| April 1
| Cubs
| 8–0
| Parsons (1–1)
| Hendricks (0–1)
| —
| SunTrust Park
| 41,912
| 1–3
| W1
|-style="background:#bfb;"
| 5
| April 3
| Cubs
| 6–4
| Jackson (1–0)
| Cishek (0–1)
| Vizcaíno (1)
| SunTrust Park
| 37,398
| 2–3
| W2
|-style="background:#bfb;"
| 6
| April 4
| Cubs
| 9–4
| Fried (1–0)
| Darvish (0–1)
| —
| SunTrust Park
| 33,815
| 3–3
| W3
|-style="background:#bfb;"
| 7
| April 5
| Marlins
| 4–0
| Gausman (1–0)
| López (0–1)
| —
| SunTrust Park
| 29,218
| 4–3
| W4
|-style="background:#fbb;
| 8
| April 6
| Marlins
| 4–2
| Romo (1–0)
| Minter (0–1)
| Conley (1)
| SunTrust Park
| 35,618
| 4–4 
| L1
|-style="background:#bfb;"
| 9
| April 7
| Marlins
| 4–3
| Vizcaíno (1–0)
| Conley (0–1)
| —
| SunTrust Park 
| 32,551
| 5–4
| W1
|-style="background:#bfb;"
| 10
| April 8
| @ Rockies
| 8–6
| Teherán (1–1)
| Freeland (1–2)
| Minter (1)
| Coors Field
| 25,199
| 6–4
|W2
|-style="background:#bfb;"
| 11
| April 9
| @ Rockies
| 7–1
| Fried (2–0)
| Márquez (1–1)
| —
| Coors Field
| 26,124
| 7–4
| W3
|-style="background:#bbb;"
| —
| April 10
| @ Rockies
| colspan=8|Postponed (snow); rescheduled for August 26
|-style="background:#fbb;
| 12
| April 11
| Mets
| 3–6
| Matz (1–0)
| Gausman (1–1)
| Díaz (5)
| SunTrust Park
| 24,015
| 7–5
| L1
|-style="background:#fbb;
| 13
| April 12
| Mets
| 2–6
| Wheeler (1–1)
| Wright (0–2)
| —
| SunTrust Park
| 33,334
| 7–6
| L2
|-style="background:#bfb;
| 14
| April 13
| Mets
| 11–7
| Toussaint (1-0)
| Oswalt (0-1)
| —
| SunTrust Park
| 40,117
| 8–6
| W1
|-style="background:#bfb;"
| 15
| April 14
| Mets
| 7–3
| Teherán (2–1)
| De Grom (2–2)
| —
| SunTrust Park
| 23,385
| 9–6
| W2
|-style="background:#fbb;
| 16
| April 16
| Diamondbacks
| 6–9
| Hirano (1–1)
| Minter (0–2)
| Holland (3)
| SunTrust Park
| 22,407
| 9–7
| L1
|-style="background:#fbb;
| 17
| April 17
| Diamondbacks
| 2–3 (10)
| Bradley (1–1)
| Biddle (0–1)
| Holland (4)
| SunTrust Park
| 22,356
| 9–8
| L2
|-style="background:#fbb;
| 18
| April 18
| Diamondbacks
| 1–4
| Weaver (1–1)
| Soroka (0–1)
| Hirano (1)
| SunTrust Park
| 24,193
| 9–9
| L3
|-style="background:#bbb;"
| —
| April 19
| @ Indians
| colspan=8|Postponed (rain); rescheduled for April 20
|-style="background:#fbb;
| 19
| April 20 (1)
| @ Indians
| 4–8
| Kluber (2–2)
| Teherán (2–2)
| —
| 
| 23,035
| 9–10
| L4
|-style="background:#bfb;"
| 20
| April 20 (2)
| @ Indians
| 8–7
| Jackson (2–0)
| Cimber (1–1)
| Minter (2)
| Progressive Field
| 23,035
| 10–10
| W1
|-style="background:#bfb;"
| 21
| April 21
| @ Indians
| 11–5
| Fried (3–0)
| Bieber (2–1)
| —
| Progressive Field
| 16,039
| 11–10
| W2
|-style="background:#fbb;
| 22
| April 23
| @ Reds
| 6–7
| Stephenson (2–0)
| Gausman (1–2)
| Iglesias (5)
| 
| 12,789
| 11–11
| L1
|-style="background:#bfb;"
| 23
| April 24
| @ Reds
| 3–1
| Soroka (1–1)
| Roark (1–1)
| Minter (3)
| Great American Ball Park
| 12,949
| 12–11
| W1
|-style="background:#fbb;
| 24
| April 25
| @ Reds
| 2–4
| Castillo (3–1)
| Teherán (2–3)
| Iglesias (6)
| Great American Ball Park
| 14,792
| 12–12
| L1
|-style="background:#fbb;
| 25
| April 26
| Rockies
| 4–8
| Senzatela (2–1)
| Fried (3–1)
| Davis (4)
| SunTrust Park
| 40,282
| 12–13
| L2
|-style="background:#fbb;
| 26
| April 27
| Rockies
| 5–9
| Shaw (1–0)
| Minter (0–3)
| —
| SunTrust Park
| 38,243
| 12–14
| L3
|-style="background:#bfb;"
| 27
| April 28
| Rockies
| 8–7
| Webb (1–0)
| Oh (1–1)
| Jackson (1)
| SunTrust Park
| 33,919
| 13–14
| W1
|-style="background:#bfb;"
| 28
| April 29
| Padres
| 3–1
| Soroka (2–1)
| Margevicius (2–3)
| Webb (1)
| SunTrust Park
| 19,353
| 14–14
| W2
|-style="background:#fbb;"
| 29
| April 30
| Padres
| 3–4
| Paddack (2–1)
| Teherán (2–4)
| Yates (14)
| SunTrust Park
| 18,626
| 14–15
| L1
|-

|-style="background:#bfb;"
| 30
| May 1
| Padres
| 5–1
| Fried (4–1)
| Quantrill (0–1)
| —
| 
| 20,394
| 15–15
| W1
|-style="background:#fbb;"
| 31
| May 2
| Padres
| 2–11
| Strahm (1–2)
| Foltynewicz (0–1)
| —
| SunTrust Park
| 23,746
| 15–16
| L1
|-style="background:#bfb;"
| 32
| May 3
| @ Marlins
| 7–2
| Toussaint (2-0)
| Ureña (1–5)
| —
| Marlins Park
| 7,198
| 16–16
| W1
|-style="background:#bfb;"
| 33
| May 4
| @ Marlins
| 9–2
| Soroka (3–1)
| Anderson (0–1)
| —
| Marlins Park
| 10,229
| 17–16
| W2
|-style="background:#bfb;"
| 34
| May 5
| @ Marlins
| 3–1 
| Tomlin (1–0)
| Guerrero (1–1)
| Jackson (2)
| Marlins Park
| 11,885
| 18–16
| W3
|-style="background:#fbb;
| 35
| May 6
| @ Dodgers
| 3–5
| Buehler (4–0)
| Gausman (1–3)
| Urías (1)
| 
| 43,393
| 18–17
| L1
|-style="background:#fbb;
| 36
| May 7
| @ Dodgers
| 0–9
| Ryu (4–1)
| Fried (4–2)
| —
| Dodger Stadium
| 47,337
| 18–18
| L2
|-style="background:#fbb;
| 37
| May 8
| @ Dodgers
| 4–9
| Kershaw (2–0)
| Foltynewicz (0–2)
| —
| Dodger Stadium
| 53,707
| 18–19
| L3
|-style="background:#fbb;
| 38
| May 9
| @ Diamondbacks
| 2–3 (10)
| Duplantier (1–0)
| Minter (0–4)
| —
| Chase Field
| 17,751
| 18–20
| L4
|-style="background:#bfb;"
| 39
| May 10
| @ Diamondbacks
| 2–1
| Winkler (1–0)
| López (0–1)
| Jackson (3)
| Chase Field
| 21,932
| 19–20
| W1
|-style="background:#bfb;"
| 40
| May 11
| @ Diamondbacks
| 6–4
| Gausman (2–3)
| Kelly (3–4)
| Venters (1)
| Chase Field
| 33,168
| 20–20
| W2
|-style="background:#bfb;"
| 41
| May 12
| @ Diamondbacks
| 5–3
| Fried (5–2)
| Godley (1–3)
| Jackson (4)
| Chase Field
| 27,460
| 21–20
| W3
|-style="background:#fbb;
| 42
| May 14
| Cardinals
| 3–14
| Flaherty (4–3)
| Foltynewicz (0–3)
| —
| SunTrust Park
| 23,718
| 21–21
| L1
|-style="background:#bfb;"
| 43
| May 15
| Cardinals
| 4–0
| Soroka (4–1)
| Wacha (3–1)
| Jackson (5)
| SunTrust Park
| 23,367
| 22–21
| W1
|-style="background:#bfb;"
| 44
| May 16
| Cardinals
| 10–2
| Teherán (3–4)
| Wainwright (3–4)
| —
| SunTrust Park
| 28,783
| 23–21
| W2
|-style="background:#bfb;"
| 45
| May 17
| Brewers
| 12–8
| Fried (6–2)
| Chacín (3–5)
| Jackson (6)
| SunTrust Park
| 36,222
| 24–21
| W3
|-style="background:#bfb;"
| 46
| May 18
| Brewers
| 4–3 (10)
| Webb (2–0)
| Hader (0–3)
| —
| SunTrust Park
| 39,121
| 25–21
| W4
|-style="background:#fbb;"
| 47
| May 19
| Brewers
| 2–3 (10)
| Hader (1–3)
| Parsons (1–2)
| —
| SunTrust Park
| 36,548
| 25–22
| L1
|-style="background:#bfb;"
| 48
| May 20
| @ Giants
| 4–1
| Soroka (5–1)
| Suarez (0–1)
| Newcomb (1)
| Oracle Park
| 29,815
| 26–22
| W1
|-style="background:#fbb;"
| 49
| May 21
| @ Giants
| 3–4
| Gott (2–0)
| Jackson (2–1)
| —
| Oracle Park
| 28,030
| 26–23
| L1
|-style="background:#bfb;"
| 50
| May 22
| @ Giants
| 9–2
| Fried (7–2)
| Samardzija (2–3)
| —
| Oracle Park
| 31,042
| 27–23
| W1
|-style="background:#bfb;"
| 51
| May 23
| @ Giants
| 5–4 (13)
| Jackson (3–1)
| Moronta (1–4)
| —
| Oracle Park
| 32,463
| 28–23
| W2
|-style="background:#bfb;"
| 52
| May 24
| @ Cardinals
| 5–2
| Foltynewicz (1–3)
| Mikolas (4–5)
| —
| Busch Stadium
| 44,630
| 29–23
| W3
|-style="background:#fbb;"
| 53
| May 25
| @ Cardinals
| 3–6
| Miller (2–2)
| Winkler (1–1)
| Hicks (10)
| Busch Stadium
| 45,760
| 29–24
| L1
|-style="background:#bfb;"
| 54
| May 26
| @ Cardinals
| 4–3
| Webb (3–0)
| Webb (0–1)
| Jackson (7)
| Busch Stadium
| 45,152
| 30–24
| W1
|-style="background:#fbb;"
| 55
| May 28
| Nationals
| 4–5
| Strasburg (5–3)
| Fried (7–3)
| Doolittle (10)
| SunTrust Park
| 27,573
| 30–25
| L1
|-style="background:#fbb;"
| 56
| May 29
| Nationals
| 4–14
| Sánchez (1–6)
| Gausman (2–4)
| McGowin (1)
| SunTrust Park
| 37,726
| 30–26
| L2
|-style="background:#fbb;"
| 57
| May 31
| Tigers
| 2–8
| Turnbull (3–4)
| Foltynewicz (1–4)
| —
| SunTrust Park
| 35,524
| 30–27
| L3
|-

|-style="background:#bfb;"
| 58
| June 1
| Tigers
| 10–5
| Soroka (6–1)
| Norris (2–4)
| Jackson (8)
| 
| 37,108
| 31–27
| W1
|-style="background:#bfb;"
| 59
| June 2
| Tigers
| 7–4
| Toussaint (3–0)
| Jiménez (2–3)
| —
| SunTrust Park
| 28,978
| 32–27
| W2
|-style="background:#bfb;"
| 60
| June 4
| @ Pirates
| 12–5
| Winkler (2–1)
| Crick (2–2)
| —
| PNC Park
| 13,963
| 33–27
| W3
|-style="background:#fbb;"
| 61
| June 5
| @ Pirates
| 4–7
| Musgrove (4–6)
| Gausman (2–5)
| —
| PNC Park
| 13,904
| 33–28
| L1
|-style="background:#fbb;"
| 62
| June 6
| @ Pirates
| 1–6
| Archer (3–5)
| Foltynewicz (1–5)
| Vázquez (15)
| PNC Park
| 18,232
| 33–29
| L2
|-style="background:#bfb;"
| 63
| June 7
| @ Marlins
| 7–1
| Soroka (7–1)
| Ureña (4–7)
| —
| Marlins Park
| 8,589
| 34–29
| W1
|-style="background:#bfb;"
| 64
| June 8
| @ Marlins
| 1–0
| Teherán (4–4)
| Richards (3–6)
| Jackson (9)
| Marlins Park
| 9,771
| 35–29
| W2
|-style="background:#bfb;"
| 65
| June 9
| @ Marlins
| 7–6 (12)
| Winkler (3–1)
| Conley (1–6)
| Tomlin (1)
| Marlins Park
| 10,959
| 36–29
| W3
|-style="background:#bfb;"
| 66
| June 10
| Pirates
| 13–7
| Newcomb (1–0)
| McRae (0–2)
| Webb (2)
| SunTrust Park
| 21,822
| 37–29
| W4
|-style="background:#bfb;"
| 67
| June 11
| Pirates
| 7–5 (8)
| Toussaint (4–0) 
| Archer (3–6)
| Swarzak (4)
| SunTrust Park
| 31,305
| 38–29
| W5
|-style="background:#bfb;"
| 68
| June 12
| Pirates
| 8–7 (11)
| Webb (4–0)
| Feliz (2–3)
| —
| SunTrust Park
| 24,428
| 39–29
| W6
|-style="background:#bfb;"
| 69
| June 13
| Pirates
| 6–5
| Teherán (5–4)
| Musgrove (4–7)
| Jackson (10)
| SunTrust Park
| 35,108
| 40–29
| W7
|-style="background:#bfb;"
| 70
| June 14
| Phillies
| 9–8
| Blevins (1–0)
| Neris (1–3)
| —
| SunTrust Park
| 41,975
| 41–29
| W8
|-style="background:#fbb;"
| 71
| June 15
| Phillies
| 5–6
| Ramos (1–0)
| Jackson (3–2)
| Neris (15)
| SunTrust Park
| 43,593
| 41–30
| L1
|-style="background:#bfb;"
| 72
| June 16
| Phillies
| 15–1
| Foltynewicz (2–5)
| Velasquez (2–4)
| —
| SunTrust Park
| 40,855
| 42–30
| W1
|-style="background:#bfb;"
| 73
| June 17
| Mets
| 12–3
| Soroka (8–1)
| Wheeler (5–5)
| —
| SunTrust Park
| 24,660
| 43–30
| W2
|-style="background:#fbb;"
| 74
| June 18
| Mets
| 2–10
| deGrom (4–6)
| Teherán (5–5)
| —
| SunTrust Park
| 24,791
| 43–31
| L1
|-style="background:#bfb;"
| 75
| June 19
| Mets
| 7–2
| Fried (8–3)
| Matz (5–5)
| —
| SunTrust Park
| 37,104
| 44–31
| W1
|-style="background:#fbb;"
| 76
| June 21
| @ Nationals
| 3–4
| Strasburg (8–4)
| Keuchel (0–1)
| Suero (1)
| Nationals Park
| 34,212
| 44–32
| L1
|-style="background:#bfb;"
| 77
| June 22
| @ Nationals
| 13–9
| Minter (1–4)
| Ross (0–1)
| —
| Nationals Park
| 37,492
| 45–32
| W1
|-style="background:#bfb;"
| 78
| June 23
| @ Nationals
| 4–3 (10)
| Minter (2–4)
| Rainey (1–2)
| Jackson (11)
| Nationals Park
| 34,256
| 46–32
| W2
|-style="background:#fbb;"
| 79
| June 24
| @ Cubs
| 3–8
| Lester (7–5)
| Teherán (5–6)
| —
| Wrigley Field
| 37,603
| 46–33
| L1
|-style="background:#bfb;"
| 80
| June 25
| @ Cubs
| 3–2
| Fried (9–3)
| Montgomery (1–2)
| Jackson (12)
| Wrigley Field
| 37,333
| 47–33
| W1
|-
|-style="background:#bfb;"
| 81
| June 26
| @ Cubs
| 5–3
| Keuchel (1–1)
| Darvish (2–4)
| Minter (4)
| Wrigley Field
| 38,017
| 48–33
| W2
|-style="background:#fbb;"
| 82
| June 27
| @ Cubs
| 7–9
| Chatwood (4–1)
| Tomlin (1–1)
| Kimbrel (1)
| Wrigley Field
| 39,823
| 48–34
| L1
|-
|-style="background:#bfb;"
| 83
| June 28
| @ Mets
| 6-2
| Soroka (9-1)
| deGrom (4–7)
| —
| Citi Field
| 36,421
| 49-34
| W1 
|-style="background:#bfb;"
| 84
| June 29
| @ Mets
| 5–4
| Newcomb (2–0)
| Lugo (3–2)
| Jackson (13)
| Citi Field
| 40,809
| 50–34
| W2
|-style="background:#fbb;"
| 85
| June 30
| @ Mets
| 5–8
| Font (2–2)
| Newcomb (2–1)
| Díaz (17)
| Citi Field
| 31,743
| 50–35
| L1
|-

|-style="background:#fbb;"
| 86
| July 2
| Phillies
| 0–2
| Nola (7–2)
| Keuchel (1–2)
| Neris (17)
| 
| 40,180
| 50–36
| L2
|-style="background:#bfb;"
| 87
| July 3
| Phillies
| 9–2
| Wilson (1–0)
| Pivetta (4–3)
| —
| SunTrust Park
| 40,147
| 51–36
| W1
|-style="background:#bfb;"
| 88
| July 4
| Phillies
| 12–6
| Minter (3–4)
| Eflin (7–8)
| —
| SunTrust Park
| 40,633
| 52–36
| W1
|-style="background:#bfb;"
| 89
| July 5
| Marlins
| 1–0
| Jackson (4–2)
| Quijada (0–3)
| —
| SunTrust Park
| 41,102
| 53–36
| W2
|-style="background:#fbb;"
| 90
| July 6
| Marlins
| 4–5
| Smith (4–4)
| Fried (9–4)
| Romo (16)
| SunTrust Park
| 37,216
| 53–37
| L1
|-style="background:#bfb;"
| 91
| July 7
| Marlins
| 4–3
| Keuchel (2–2)
| Richards (3–10)
| Jackson (14)
| SunTrust Park
| 30,514
| 54–37
| W1
|- style="text-align:center; background:#bbcaff;"
| colspan="10" | 90th All-Star Game: Cleveland, OH
|
|-style="background:#bfb;"
| 92
| July 12
| @ Padres
| 5–3
| Keuchel (3–2)
| Lamet (0–2)
| Jackson (15)
| Petco Park
| 34,692
| 55–37
| W2
|-style="background:#bfb;"
| 93
| July 13
| @ Padres
| 7–5 
| Newcomb (3–1)
| Perdomo (1–2)
| Jackson (16)
| Petco Park
| 43,148
| 56–37
| W3
|-style="background:#bfb;"
| 94
| July 14
| @ Padres
| 4–1
| Soroka (10–1)
| Wingenter (1–2)
| Minter (5)
| Petco Park
| 34,739
| 57–37
| W4
|-style="background:#bfb;"
| 95
| July 15
| @ Brewers
| 4–2
| Fried (10–4)
| Houser (2–4)
| Jackson (17)
| Miller Park
| 31,850
| 58–37
| W5
|-style="background:#fbb;"
| 96
| July 16
| @ Brewers
| 1–13
| Woodruff (11–3)
| Wilson (1–1)
| —
| Miller Park
| 31,599
| 58–38
| L1
|-style="background:#fbb;"
| 97
| July 17
| @ Brewers
| 4–5
| Anderson (5–2)
| Keuchel (3–3)
| Hader (21)
| Miller Park
| 36,928
| 58–39
| L2
|-style="background:#fbb;"
| 98
| July 18
| Nationals
| 4–13
| Strasburg (12–4)
| Wright (0–3)
| —
| SunTrust Park
| 39,363
| 58–40
| L3
|-style="background:#bfb;"
| 99
| July 19
| Nationals
| 4–3
| Jackson (5–2)
| Rodney (0–3)
| —
| SunTrust Park
| 39,344
| 59–40
| W1
|-style="background:#fbb;"
| 100
| July 20
| Nationals
| 3–5
| Sánchez (6–6)
| Soroka (10–2)
| Doolittle (21)
| SunTrust Park
| 42,467
| 59–41
| L1
|-style="background:#bfb;"
| 101
| July 21
| Nationals
| 7–1
| Gausman (3–5)
| Ross (0–2)
| —
| SunTrust Park
| 31,848
| 60–41
| W1
|-style="background:#fbb;"
| 102
| July 23
| Royals
| 4–5
| Hill (1–0)
| Swarzak (2–3)
| Kennedy (18)
| SunTrust Park
| 36,570
| 60–42
| L1
|-style="background:#fbb;"
| 103
| July 24
| Royals
| 0–2
| Keller (7–9)
| Teherán (5–7)
| Kennedy (19)
| SunTrust Park
| 38,863
| 60–43
| L2
|-style="background:#bfb;"
| 104
| July 26
| @ Phillies
| 9–2
| Newcomb (4–1)
| Arrieta (8–8)
| —
| 
| 31,268
| 61–43
| W1
|-style="background:#bfb;"
| 105
| July 27
| @ Phillies
| 15–7
| Fried (11–4)
| Eflin (7–11)
| —
| Citizens Bank Park
| 39,340
| 62–43
| W2
|-style="background:#fbb;"
| 106
| July 28
| @ Phillies
| 2–9
| Nola (9–2)
| Gausman (3–6)
| —
| Citizens Bank Park
| 37,037
| 62–44
| L1
|-style="background:#fbb;"
| 107
| July 29
| @ Nationals
| 3–6
| Corbin (9–5)
| Keuchel (3–4)
| —
| Nationals Park
| 24,292
| 62–45
| L2
|-style="background:#bfb;"
| 108
| July 30
| @ Nationals
| 11–8
| Teherán (6–7)
| Fedde (1–2)
| —
| Nationals Park
| 26,566
| 63–45
| W1
|-style="background:#bfb;"
| 109
| July 31
| @ Nationals
| 5–4 (10)
| Newcomb (5–1)
| Doolittle (6–3)
| Tomlin (2)
| Nationals Park
| 31,576
| 64–45
| W2
|-

|- style="background:#bfb;"
| 110
| August 1
| Reds
| 4–1 
| Fried (12–4)
| DeSclafani (6–6)
| —
| 
| 28,677
| 65–45
| W3
|- style="background:#fbb;"
| 111
| August 2
| Reds
| 2–5
| Wood (1–0)
| Gausman (3–7)
| Iglesias (21)
| SunTrust Park
| 37,743
| 65–46
| L1
|-style="background:#bfb;"
| 112
| August 3
| Reds
| 5–4 (10)
| Jackson (6–2)
| Hughes (3–4)
| —
| SunTrust Park
| 42,085
| 66–46
| W1
|- style="background:#fbb;"
| 113
| August 4
| Reds
| 4–6 (10)
| Stephenson (3–2)
| Greene (0–3)
| Hernandez (2)
| SunTrust Park
| 33,083
| 66–47
| L1
|-style="background:#fbb;"
| 114
| August 5
| @ Twins
| 3–5
| May (5–3)
| Martin (0–3)
| —
| Target Field
| 26,722
| 66–48
| L2
|-style="background:#bfb;"
| 115
| August 6
| @ Twins
| 12–7
| Foltynewicz (3–5)
| Berríos (10–6)
| —
| Target Field
| 36,721
| 67–48
| W1
|-style="background:#bfb;"
| 116
| August 7
| @ Twins
| 11–7
| Fried (13–4)
| Perez (8–5)
| —
| Target Field
| 35,682
| 68–48
| W2
|-style="background:#fbb;"
| 117
| August 8
| @ Marlins
| 2–9
| Hernández (2–4)
| Keuchel (3–5)
| —
| Marlins Park
| 8,948
| 68–49
| L1
|-style="background:#bfb;"
| 118
| August 9
| @ Marlins
| 8–4
| Teherán (7–7)
| Smith (7–6)
| —
| Marlins Park
| 8,057
| 69–49
| W1
|-style="background:#fbb;"
| 119
| August 10
| @ Marlins
| 6–7 
| Brigham (2–1)
| Newcomb (5–2)
| —
| Marlins Park
| 29,720
| 69–50
| L1
|-style="background:#bfb;"
| 120
| August 11
| @ Marlins
| 5–4
| Foltynewicz (4–5)
| Noesí (0–2)
| Jackson (18)
| Marlins Park
| 12,338
| 70–50
| W1
|-style="background:#bfb;"
| 121
| August 13
| Mets
| 5–3
| Fried (14–4)
| Wheeler (9–7)
| Melancon (2)
| SunTrust Park
| 27,627
| 71–50
| W2
|-style="background:#bfb;"
| 122
| August 14
| Mets
| 6–4
| Martin (1–3)
| Lugo (5–3)
| Blevins (1)
| SunTrust Park
| 23,582
| 72–50
| W3
|-style="background:#fbb;"
| 123
| August 15
| Mets
| 8–10
| Stroman (7–11)
| Teherán (7–8)
| Díaz (25)
| SunTrust Park
| 25,424
| 72–51
| L1
|-style="background:#fbb;"
| 124
| August 16
| Dodgers
| 3–8
| Kolarek (5–3)
| Newcomb (5–3)
| Urías (4)
| SunTrust Park
| 41,413
| 72–52
| L2
|-style="background:#bfb;"
| 125
| August 17
| Dodgers
| 4–3
| Newcomb (6–3)
| Ryu (12–3)
| Melancon (3)
| SunTrust Park
| 43,619
| 73–52
| W1
|-style="background:#bfb;"
| 126
| August 18
| Dodgers
| 5–3
| Swarzak (3–3)
| May (1–2)
| Melancon (4)
| SunTrust Park
| 37,617
| 74–52
| W2
|-style="background:#bfb;"
| 127
| August 20
| Marlins
| 5–1
| Keuchel (4–5)
| Kinley (1–1)
| —
| SunTrust Park
| 37,217
| 75–52
| W3
|-style="background:#bfb;"
| 128
| August 21
| Marlins
| 5–0
| Teherán (8–8)
| Smith (8–7)
| —
| SunTrust Park
| 23,537
| 76–52
| W4
|-style="background:#bfb;"
| 129
| August 22
| Marlins
| 3–2
| Melancon (5–2)
| Stanek (0–3)
| —
| SunTrust Park
| 23,967
| 77–52
| W5
|-style="background:#bfb;"
| 130
| August 23
| @ Mets
| 2–1 
| Jackson (7–2)
| Familia (4–2)
| Melancon (5)
| Citi Field
| 31,437
| 78–52
| W6
|- style="background:#bfb;"
| 131
| August 24
| @ Mets
| 9–5
| Tomlin (2–1)
| Brach (4–4)
| —
| Citi Field
| 38,300
| 79–52
| W7
|-style="background:#bfb;"
| 132
| August 25
| @ Mets
| 2–1
| Keuchel (5–5)
| Matz (8–8)
| Melancon (6)
| Citi Field
| 30,170
| 80–52
| W8
|-style="background:#fbb;"
| 133
| August 26
| @ Rockies
| 1–3
| Díaz (5–3)
| Swarzak (3–4)
| —
| Coors Field
| 29,803
| 80–53
| L1
|-style="background:#fbb;"
| 134
| August 27
| @ Blue Jays
| 1–3
| Godley (4–5)
| Soroka (10–3)
| Giles (17)
| Rogers Centre
| 24,578
| 80–54
| L2
|-style="background:#bfb;"
| 135
| August 28
| @ Blue Jays
| 9–4
| Jackson (8–2)
| Waguespack (4–2)
| —
| Rogers Centre
| 23,112
| 81–54
| W1
|-
|-style="background:#bfb;"
| 136
| August 30
| White Sox
| 10-7
| Fried (15–4)
| Nova(9-11)
| Melancon (7)
| SunTrust Park
| 39,097
| 82-54
| W2
|-
|-style="background:#bfb;"
| 137
| August 31
| White Sox
|11-5
| Keuchel  (6-5)
| Lopez (8-12)
| —
| SunTrust Park
|36,664
|83-54
|W3
|-

|-
|-style="background:#bfb;"
|138
| September 1
| White Sox
| 5–3
| Teherán (9–8)
| Giolito (14–8)
| Melancon (8)
| 
| 41,397
| 84–54
| W4
|-
|-style="background:#bfb;"
| 139
| September 2
| Blue Jays
| 6–3
| Soroka (11–3)
| Waguespack (4–3)
| Melancon (9)
| SunTrust Park
| 28,987
| 85–54
| W5|-
|-style="background:#bfb;" 
|140
| September 3
| Blue Jays
| 7–2
| Foltynewicz (5–5)
| Font (3–4)
| —
| SunTrust Park| 25,427
| 86–54
| W6
|-
|-style="background:#bfb;"
| 141
| September 5
| Nationals
| 4–2
| Fried (16–4)
| Strasburg (16–6)
| —
| SunTrust Park| 28,831
| 87–54
| W7
|-
|-style="background:#bfb;"
| 142
| September 6
| Nationals
| 4–3
| Keuchel (7–5)
| Corbin (11–7)
| Greene (23)
| SunTrust Park| 37,181
| 88–54
| W8
|-
|-style="background:#bfb;"
| 143
| September 7
| Nationals
| 5–4
| Teherán (10–8)
| Voth (1–1)
| Melancon (10)
| SunTrust Park| 40,467
| 89–54
| W9
|-
|-style="background:#fbb;"
| 144
| September 8
| Nationals
| 4–9
| Scherzer (10–5)
| Soroka (11–4)
| —
| SunTrust Park| 31,789
| 89–55
|L1
|-
|-style="background:#bfb;"
| 145
| September 9
| @ Phillies
| 7–2
| Foltynewicz (6–5)
| Nola (12–5)
| —
| 
| 25,071
| 90–55
| W1
|-style="background:#fbb;"
| 146
| 
| @ Phillies
| 5–6
| Parker (3–2)
| Fried (16–5)
| Neris (25)
| Citizens Bank Park
| 24,220
| 90–56
| L1
|-
|-style="background:#bfb;"
| 147
| September 11
| @ Phillies
|3–1
|Keuchel (8–5)
|Eflin (8–12)
|Melancon (11)
|Citizens Bank Park
|23,243
|91–56
|W1
|-style="background:#fbb;"
| 148
| September 12
| @ Phillies
|5–9
|Hughes (5–5)
|Teherán (10–9)
| —
|Citizens Bank Park
|27,022
|91–57
|L1
|-style="background:#bfb;"
| 149
| September 13
| @ Nationals
|5–0
|Soroka (12–4)
|Scherzer (10–6)
|— 
|Nationals Park
|39,730
|92–57
|W1
|-style="background:#bfb;"
| 150
| September 14
| @ Nationals
|10–1
|Foltynewicz (7–5)
|Suero (5–8)
|—
|Nationals Park
|39,664
|93–57
|W2
|-style="background:#fbb;"
| 151
| September 15
| @ Nationals
|0–7
|Sánchez (9–8)
|Fried (16–6)
| —
|Nationals Park
|29,350
|93–58
|L1
|-style="background:#fbb;"
| 152
| September 17
|Phillies
| 4–5
| Velasquez (7–7)
| Keuchel (8–6)
| Neris (27)
|SunTrust Park| 28,843
| 93–59
| L2
|-style="background:#fbb;"
| 153
| September 18
|Phillies
| 1–4
| Eflin (9–12)
| Teherán (10–10)
| Neris (28)
|SunTrust Park| 27,937
| 93–60
| L3
|-
|-style="background:#bfb;"
| 154
| September 19
|Phillies
| 5–4
| Soroka (13–4)
| Nola (12–6)
| Melancon (12)
| SunTrust Park| 33,223
| 94–60
| W1
|-style="background:#bfb;"
| 155
| September 20
|Giants
| 6–0
| Foltynewicz (8–5)
| Beede (5–10)
| —
|SunTrust Park| 37,419
| 95–60
| W2
|-
|-style="background:#bfb;"
| 156
| September 21
| Giants
| 8–1
| Fried (17–6)
| Cueto (1–1)
| —
| SunTrust Park| 40,899
| 96–60
| W3
|-style="background:#fbb;"
| 157
| September 22
|Giants
| 1–4
| Webb (2–2)
| Keuchel (8–7)
| Smith (34)
|SunTrust Park| 33,674
| 96–61
| L1
|-style="background:#fbb;"
| 158
| September 24
| @ Royals
| 6–9
| Duffy (7–6)
| Teherán (10–11)
| —
|Kauffman Stadium
| 16,688
| 96–62
| L2
|-style="background:#bfb;"
| 159
| September 25
| @ Royals
| 10–2
| Jackson (9–2)
| Barnes (1–4)
| —
|Kauffman Stadium
| 16,931
| 97–62
| W1
|-style="background:#fbb;"
| 160
| September 27
| @ Mets
| 2–4
| Stroman (10–13)
| Keuchel (8–8)
| Lugo (6)
|Citi Field
| 26,264
| 97–63
| L1
|-style="background:#fbb;"
| 161
| September 28
| @ Mets
| 0–3
| Matz (11–10)
| Foltynewicz (8–6)
| Díaz (26)
|Citi Field
| 32,210
| 97–64
| L2
|-style="background:#fbb;"
| 162
| September 29
| @ Mets
| 6–7 
| Mazza (1–1)
| Dayton (0–1)
| —
|Citi Field
| 31,523
| 97–65
| L3
|-

|-
| Legend:       = Win       = Loss       = PostponementBold = Braves team member

Standings
National League East

National League Wild Card

Postseason
Game log

|-style=background:#fbb;"
| 1 
| October 3
| Cardinals 
| 6–7
| Martínez (1–0)
| Melancon (0–1)
| — 
| 42,631
| 0–1
|-style=background:#bfb;"
| 2 
| October 4 
| Cardinals 
| 3–0
| Foltynewicz (1–0)
| Flaherty (0–1)
| Melancon (1)
| 42,911
| 1–1
|-style=background:#bfb;"
| 3 
| October 6 
| @ Cardinals 
| 3–1
| Newcomb (1–0)
| Martínez (1–1)
| Melancon (2) 
| 46,701
| 2–1
|-style=background:#fbb;"
| 4 
| October 7 
| @ Cardinals 
| 4–5 
| Mikolas (1–0)
| Teherán (0–1)
| — 
| 42,203
| 2–2
|-style=background:#fbb;"
| 5 
| October 9 
| Cardinals 
| 1–13
| Flaherty (1–1)
| Foltynewicz' (1–1)
| — 
| 43,122
| 2–3
|-

Postseason rosters

| style="text-align:left" |
Pitchers: 15 Sean Newcomb 19 Shane Greene 26 Mike Foltynewicz 32 Josh Tomlin 36 Mark Melancon 40 Mike Soroka 49 Julio Teherán  51 Chris Martin  54 Max Fried 56 Darren O'Day 60 Dallas Keuchel 77 Luke Jackson 
Catchers: 16 Brian McCann 25 Tyler Flowers 45 Francisco Cervelli 
Infielders: 1 Ozzie Albies 5 Freddie Freeman 7 Dansby Swanson 20 Josh Donaldson 24 Adeiny Hechavarria 
Outfielders: 9 Billy Hamilton 13 Ronald Acuña Jr. 14 Matt Joyce 18 Rafael Ortega 22 Nick Markakis 23 Adam Duvall
|- valign="top"

Record vs. opponents

Roster

Farm system

References

External links
2019 Atlanta Braves season at Baseball Reference''

Atlanta Braves seasons
Atlanta Braves
Atlanta Braves
National League East champion seasons